Events from the year 1604 in Denmark.

Incumbents 

 Monarch - Christian IV
 Steward of the Realm;

Events

Undated 
 Christian IV's Arsenal is completed at Slotsholmen in Copenhagen

Births

Deaths 
 May 13 – Christine of Hesse, Duchess consort (born 1543)
 17 October – Ingeborg Skeel, noble, land owner and county sheriff (b. c.1545)

References 

 
Denmark
Years of the 17th century in Denmark